Dr. Richard (Dick) Stanton-Jones D.Sc(Hon), FEng, M.A., M.Sc., CEng. (25 September 1926 – 23 January 1991) was an English aeronautical engineer, chief designer Saunders-Roe, managing director of British Hovercraft Corp. and vice-chairman of Westland Helicopters.

He is perhaps best known for his contribution, along with Sir. Christopher Cockerell, to the development of the SR.N1 hovercraft manufactured by Saunders-Roe.

Life
Richard Stanton-Jones was born in Bombay, India to Indian Army Officer,  Brig. John C. Jones OBE and Katharine Stanton, daughter of the American missionary Rev. Dr. William A Stanton.

He attended King Edward VI College, Stourbridge, King's College, Cambridge and the College of Aeronautics, Cranfield.

In 1950, Richard Stanton-Jones joined De Havilland Engine Co. He worked under A.V. Cleaver in the DH special projects section.

In 1949, he married Dorine Mary Watkins, and in 1950 they had a son, Richard Stanton-Jones Jr.

In 1968 Richard Stanton-Jones won the Sperry Award along with Sir. Christopher Cockerell "...for the design, construction and application of a family of commercially useful hovercraft."

Richard Stanton-Jones died of lung cancer at his house, "Doubloon," Seaview, Isle of Wight, United Kingdom on 23 January 1991.

Publications
R. Stanton Jones, (1950)  "An empirical method for rapidly estimating the loading distributions on swept back wings" p. 17-23.

R. Stanton-Jones, M.A., D.C.Ae., C.Eng., A.F.R.Ae.S., (1993) "The Future Development of Hovercraft: The 1968 Lord Sempill Paper", Aircraft Engineering and Aerospace Technology, Vol. 40 Iss: 5, pp. 4 – 15

References

External links
 The Papers of Richard Stanton-Jones, Churchill College, Cambridge

Alumni of King's College, Cambridge
1926 births
1991 deaths
People educated at King Edward VI College, Stourbridge
Saunders-Roe
20th-century British engineers